Mental health issues are prevalent in South Korea, with the highest suicide rate in the OECD  and the highest rate of hospitalizations for mental illness among OECD (Organisation for Economic Co-operation and Development) countries. South Korea has state-funded mental health services, the majority of which are inpatient hospital facilities, but they are largely underfunded and underutilized. Despite the prevalence of mental illness, social stigma remains prevalent throughout the South Korean population, which discourages sufferers from seeking treatment. Mental illness, while present across all demographic groups, is most common among the elderly and adolescents in South Korea.

History 
Western medicine was first introduced to South Korea by missionary doctors, and led to the transition of mental healthcare from shamanistic healers and traditional Korean medicine to mental hospitals sponsored by the Japanese government, which was occupying Korea, by 1910. Missionary hospitals, which tended to be more humane, also existed, but the isolation of patients by government mental hospitals contributed to the development of stigma in Korean society. Recently, the basis of mental healthcare in South Korea has shifted from long-term hospital stays to community-based healthcare, but the length of admission of those staying in mental hospitals is on an upward trend. This calls into question the effectiveness of South Korean health infrastructure, as the average length of stay in other OECD countries was less than a quarter of that in South Korea in 2011. Some experts question how well treatment methods in South Korean mental hospitals are working compared to that of other OECD countries.

Societal perceptions of mental illness 
South Koreans have been found to have comparatively higher levels of internalized stigma, which relates to higher rates of mental illness and more severe symptoms. Seeking treatment for mental health conditions is largely frowned upon in Korean culture, with reports stating that only seven percent of those affected by mental illness seek psychiatric help. As a culture heavily influenced by Confucianism, the honor of the family is prioritized over the individual, leading Koreans to forgo treatment to preserve their family's face. It is also said by Korean doctors that Confucian culture emphasizes individual will and self-discipline which creates a social prejudice against mental health. Traditional Confucian ideals state that mental illnesses/disorders are meant to be tolerated, not treated. Studies have shown that those above 70 were less likely to seek treatment than those within the 19-29 years old age group because of such Confucian ideals. Gender also seems to affect those seeking help for mental illnesses. Women are more likely to seek medical attention to attend to their mental health needs than men, most likely because men have higher perceived stigma of mental health. Those who turn to therapy often pay out-of-pocket and in cash to avoid the stigma associated with mental health services on one's insurance record. Stigma also hinders the ability of those recovering from mental illness to reintegrate into society.

Mental healthcare 
South Korean law prohibits workplace discrimination based on mental health conditions, but discrimination persists due to the lack of enforcement of such legislation. Psychiatrists and other mental health professionals are well-trained and numerous, but mental healthcare remains isolated from primary care, still a major contributor to South Korea's strong stigma against mental healthcare. Mental health medication is widely available, and almost all medications available to patients in the West are available in South Korea. The universal health coverage as provided by the state means that the majority of South Koreans can afford medicine and treatment for mental illness, but stigma often discourages people from utilizing their health coverage.

Public spending on mental healthcare remained low, at 3%, most of which goes to inpatient mental hospitals despite the fact that most people receive treatment from outpatient facilities. As of 2005, the Korean government did not officially allot any funds towards mental healthcare in the national budget. There has been an increase in the recent years. In 2019, the mental health budget in South Korea was 253.4 million in USD: US$90.3 million came from the general fund, US$63.8 million came from the National Health Promotion Fund, and the last US$97.3 million came from the special account for national mental hospitals. In 2020, the national budget allocated for mental health was 301 billion South Korean won, a 49.5 increase from the budget for mental health treatment in 2017. However, a study has shown that the burden of mental health and behavioral disorders (MBDs) created challenges on the Korean healthcare system that could not be repaired efficiently by this current budget.

The South Korean government passed the Mental Health Act in 1995. The Mental Health Act expanded the number of national mental hospitals and community mental health centers with the goal of making mental healthcare more accessible to communities. However, the act also made involuntary hospitalizations significantly easier. In 2017, the Mental Health Act was amended to protect the individual rights and liberties of those admitted to inpatient mental hospitals. The 1999 Medical Protection Act and Welfare Law for the Handicapped protect the rights of disabled persons, and the mentally ill have qualified for protection under these laws since 2000.

Mental illness

Contributing factors 
Economic hardship during the late 1990s led to a sharp increase in mental illness and suicide in South Korea, as well as almost all other Asian countries that the economic depression affected.  Social stigma within the South Korean population likewise discourages people from initially seeking treatment, exacerbating the severity of mental illness. Cultural factors other than stigma, such as binge-drinking, may also contribute to mental health issues within South Korean society. Due to Korea's societal, academic and corporate structure, Koreans are placed under substantial stress from a relatively young age. Korean children and adolescents are placed in an education system that has a relentless focus on intellectual excellence, with anything less than such considered unacceptable. Suicide is the leading cause of death for adolescent Koreans, making suicide a suffocating reality in school systems. Korean students face not only academic pressure, but also the common stressors that the average student faces in any school setting.  Social exclusion is a contributing factor to depression amongst Koreans aged from 10 to 19. In school systems children are victimized for their economic status or for other trivial reasons. Korean students are encouraged to excel above their peers which encourages a competitive environment welcoming hostility amongst peers. Korean students who have been bullied are said to have lower tests scores, lower self-esteem and increased levels of anxiety, making them more likely to become victims of depression.

Depression 
In 2001, between 14 and 15.2 percent of the South Korean population was estimated to have major depressive disorder as outlined in the DSM-IV, a number which has been increasing. The latest number recorded of the percent of the population diagnosed with depression, 10.7%, was recorded in 2011. Women, smokers, shift workers, those with poor health, those who exercise in the evenings, those who perceive their lives to be stressful, and those that were underweight were more likely to have major depressive disorder. A potential reason that this statistic has risen within the last decade could be from the low access rate to health care services for depression. A study reported that the average percent annual treatment rate for depression was 39.2%. Within the population of those diagnosed with depression, only 16.0% seek treatment. Among those in the population that seek treatment, individuals with a college education are more likely to undergo depression treatment, 38.0%, than those without an education. Educational level has been shown to have an association with those seeking treatment for depression; with more education, individuals are more exposed to health information and actively respond to this new knowledge. Individuals that are above the age of 70 are also less likely to receive depression consultation than those aged between 19 and 29 years.

Alcohol use disorder 
Compared to the United States and other East Asian countries, alcohol use disorder is more prevalent in Korea, and treatment is four times less likely to be sought out in Korea. The 2009 Korea National Health and Nutrition Examination Survey found that less than 2% of those with alcohol use disorder had received any form of treatment or intervention by a professional. Kye-Song Lee found in a 2013 study that nearly 7% of South Koreans have alcohol use disorder, the highest rate of any country in the world. South Koreans drink more alcohol by volume per capita than the residents of any other country in the world, consuming twice as much alcohol and 1.5 times as much hard alcohol per person as Russians, the next highest consumers. The prevalence of alcohol use disorder is increased by the expectation of businesspeople to engage in heavy drinking with their colleagues after work. In addition to being seen as a method of bonding with friends and colleagues, drinking alcohol is also viewed as a method of stress-relief.

Other mental illness 
Maeng-Je Cho et al. found that over one-third of the South Korean population has had a mental disorder at any point in their lives, and over one-fifth have experienced a disorder in the past year. 17% of the South Korean population has insomnia, which is a rate comparable to that of insomnia in the United States. 6.6% of Koreans have nicotine dependence disorder, 2% have a mood disorder, and 5.2% have an anxiety disorder, all of which are less frequent among Koreans than among Americans.

Post-traumatic stress disorder (PTSD) is especially prevalent among refugees from North Korea living in South Korea. In a 2005 study, Jeon et al. found that 29.5% of North Korean refugees in South Korea were found to suffer from PTSD. A higher rate was found among female refugees than male refugees.

Demographics of mental illness

Mental illness in the elderly 
Between 17.8 and 27.9 percent of those aged 65 or older in South Korea are likely to suffer from depression, significantly higher than the rate in other countries. Factors associated with late life depression in Korea include living alone, smoking, financial hardships and intellectual disability. The high rate of depression among Korean elders may be a result of the rapidly aging population and the dissolution of the tradition of children caring for their aging parents. Government social services for the elderly, such as the Law of Elderly Welfare, are inadequate to provide for the growing population's needs, contributing to mental illness within the demographic.

Among a sample of elderly Koreans living in the United States, 34% were found to have depression, less than a fifth of which had ever seen a mental health professional. The majority of older Koreans living in the United States exhibited a negative perception of mental health services.

Mental illness in adolescents 
More than 10% of Seoul adolescents have been found at high risk for internet addiction disorder. Internet addiction is positively correlated with family factors including child abuse and a harsh parenting style. Depression and obsessive-compulsive disorder are both correlated with internet addiction among adolescents.

The 2009 study named, Addictive Internet Use among Korean Adolescents:A National Survey, found that a reason why internet addiction disorder is so prominent in Seoul adolescents, is due to a large number or students using the internet primarily for online gaming. In middle school males, 67.0% listed online gaming as their primary use of the internet. High school males listed online gaming as their primary use of the internet at 44.8%. When females of the same age are taken into account, 23% listed their primary use for blogging/ updating personal homepages. High school females listed searching information at 23.9% as their primary use of the internet. A reason why males are more exposed to internet addiction disorder is the idea of internet shops called PC bangs, where the common customers are male from mid teens to late twenties.

Hyun-Sook Park et al. have found a gender difference in predictors of suicide ideation among Korean youth; with the main predictors for females being bullying, sexual orientation, depression, low self-esteem, and hostility; and the  primary predictors for males being history of suicide attempt, parental alcohol abuse, smoking, hostility, and low self-esteem.

Suicide 

Suicide in South Korea occurs at the 12th highest rate in the world (4th highest for female cases) and the highest rate among the OECD counties. In 2013, the suicide rate in South Korea was 29.1 per 100,000, a decrease from 33.3 per 100,000 in 2011. This rate is more than twice the OECD average. Between 2000 and 2011, South Korea's suicide rate more than doubled, contrary to the international trend of a steadily decreasing suicide rate. The OECD reported that in 2019, the rate of suicide was 24.6 per 100,000. This is a decrease from past reported years, but still noticeably high among other listed countries, such as the United States, Canada, Sweden, and more. This rise in suicides is potentially linked to the economic wellbeing of South Koreans, as suicides have historically been higher during times of economic strife. The increase in suicides has been most significant among women, adolescents, and the elderly.

References 

South Korea
Mental Health